Harold Claude Noel Williams (6 December 1914 – 5 April 1990), commonly known as H. C. N. Williams or Bill Williams, was an Anglican priest and author.

Williams was born in Grahamstown, South Africa and educated at Graeme College (South Africa) and Durham University, where he was a Theological Exhibitioner at Hatfield College.

He was ordained in 1938 and began his ministry as a curate at St Mary with St Paul's Weeke near Winchester in  England. From 1941 to 1949 he was Principal of St Matthew's College in South Africa. He then returned to England and held incumbencies at St Bartholomew's Hyde, Winchester and St Mary's, Southampton. In 1958 he became Provost of the Cathedral Church of St Michael, Coventry, a position he held for 23 years.

Writings

 African Folk Songs, 1948
 Vision of Duty, 1963
 Twentieth Century Cathedral: An Examination of the Role of Cathedrals in the Strategy of the Church in the Changing Pattern of a Twentieth Century Community, 1964
 Coventry Cathedral and its Ministry, 1965
 Coventry Cathedral in Action, 1968
 Basics and Variables: The Future of the Church in the Modern World, 1970
 The Latter Glory: The Story of Coventry Cathedral, 1978
 Order My Steps in Thy Way, 1982
 Building A Community, 1990 (publ.2012)

References

1914 births
People from Makhanda, Eastern Cape
Alumni of Graeme College
Provosts and Deans of Coventry
1990 deaths
Alumni of Hatfield College, Durham